

The railway station located at Port Pirie South bore the name "Port Pirie" from when it was built in 1876 until it was superseded in 1902 by a passenger station in the centre of Port Pirie. The new station was then assigned the name "Port Pirie railway station" and the original was named Port Pirie South railway station, in keeping with the naming of the adjacent Port Pirie South railway yards.

The wooden station building was opened in 1876 at the terminus of the lightly engineered, 1067 mm (3 ft 6 in) gauge railway from Port Pirie – then a town of fewer than 1,000 people – into the rich agricultural hinterland of the Mid North. The need was to transport agricultural produce more cheaply to the port for export, mainly to Great Britain, in sailing ships. The following year, Port Pirie's inaugural railway station was opened. A modest weatherboard building, it was placed at the north end of the railway yards, about 250 metres (270 yards) from the town's wharves. In addition to the building there were two locomotive sheds and a freight shed, coaling and watering facilities, a passing loop in front of the station building, and a few sidings.

Since the railway was such an advance over horse-drawn wagons or bullock drays over unmade roads, traffic soon increased significantly, especially when in the following year the line reached the nearest town in the hinterland – Gladstone,  52 km (32 mi) east of the port – and, more so, Petersburg, a further 64 km (40 mi) east, in 1881. In the years that followed, more trackage was constructed in the yards to accommodate the increased tonnages and variety of freight. The yards eventually became known as "Port Pirie South Yard", then many years later, "Pirie Main Yard". 

In 1884, the South Australian Government, quickly realising the importance of new silver-lead-zinc discoveries at Broken Hill, passed an Act authorising a railway extending from the Port Pirie line at Petersburg to the New South Wales border at Cockburn – thus forestalling the prospect of the New South Wales Government building a line to a port in that state. The railway reached Cockburn, 351 km (218 mi) from Port Pirie, in 1888. The first Port Pirie furnaces began operating in 1889 and the smelter was completed in 1892, relegating a competing proposal from Port Adelaide to history. The line soon became the most important of the South Australian Railways. It was a vast improvement in the economics and efficiency of transporting the ore compared with the bullock drays used previously. The ore traffic and the smelter were to have a profound effect on the town, turning it from a bustling small port into an industrial city.

Since the 1880s, passenger trains had run 750 metres (800 yards) beyond Port Pirie South to a more convenient locality in Ellen Street, in the centre of the town, where tracks had been laid for traffic to and from the smelters, located a further 400 metres (440 yards) north. A small tin-shed ticket office was erected. In 1902, a new, flamboyant stone building in the Victorian Pavilion style replaced the shed. Ellen Street station operated concurrently with Port Pirie South station until the latter was closed following the opening of the Solomontown station in 1911.

Subsequent station (concurrent 1902–1911): Ellen Street.

See also
South Australian Railways
Transport in South Australia

Notes

References

Port Pirie
Buildings and structures in Port Pirie
Railway stations in South Australia
Disused railway stations in South Australia
Railway stations in Australia opened in 1876